Dhamar may refer to:

Places
Dhamar Governorate, Yemen
Dhamar, Yemen
Thamar University
Dhamar, Rohtak, India

Other uses
Dhamar (music), one of the talas used in Hindustani classical music

See also

Damar (disambiguation)
Dahmer (disambiguation)